Cloverdale is an unincorporated community in Monroe County, West Virginia, United States. Cloverdale is north of Peterstown.

References

Unincorporated communities in Monroe County, West Virginia
Unincorporated communities in West Virginia